Cyprus is a member of the United Nations along with most of its agencies as well as the Commonwealth of Nations, World Bank, International Monetary Fund and Council of Europe. In addition, the country has signed the General Agreement on Tariffs and Trade (GATT) and the Multilateral Investment Guarantee Agency Agreement (MIGA). Cyprus has been a member of the European Union since 2004 and in the second half of the 2012 it held the Presidency of the Council of the European Union.

Historical non-alignment

Cyprus has historically followed a non-aligned foreign policy, although it increasingly identifies with the West in its cultural affinities and trade patterns, and maintains close relations with the European Union, Greece, Armenia, Lebanon, and Russia.

The prime originator of Cypriot non-alignment was Archbishop of Cyprus Makarios III, the first President (1960–1977) of the independent republic of Cyprus. Prior to independence, Makarios - by virtue of his post as Archbishop of Cyprus and head of the Cypriot Orthodox Church - was the Greek Cypriot Ethnarch, or de facto leader of the community. A highly influential figure well before independence, he participated in the 1955 Bandung Conference. After independence, Makarios took part in the 1961 founding meeting of the Non-Aligned Movement in Belgrade.

Reasons for this neutrality may lie in the extreme pressures exerted on the infant Republic by its larger neighbours, Turkey and Greece. Intercommunal rivalries and movements for union with Greece or partial union with Turkey may have persuaded Makarios to steer clear of close affiliation with either side. In any case Cyprus became a high-profile member of the Non-Aligned Movement and retained its membership until its entry into the European Union in 2004. At the non-governmental level, Cyprus has also been a member of the popular extension of the Non-Aligned Movement, the Afro-Asian Peoples' Solidarity Organisation hosting several high-level meetings.

Immediately after the 1974 Greek-sponsored coup d'état and the Turkish invasion, Makarios secured international recognition of his administration as the legitimate government of the whole island. This was disputed only by Turkey, which currently recognizes only the Turkish Republic of Northern Cyprus, established in 1983.

Since the 1974 crisis, the chief aim of the foreign policy of the Republic of Cyprus has been to secure the withdrawal of Turkish forces and the reunification of the island under the most favorable constitutional and territorial settlement possible. This campaign has been pursued primarily through international forums such as the United Nations and the Non-Aligned Movement, and in recent years through the European Union.

Bilateral relations

Africa

Americas

Asia

Europe

Cyprus' 1990 application for full EU membership caused a storm in the Turkish Cypriot community, which argued that the move required their consent. Following the December 1997 EU Summit decisions on EU enlargement, accession negotiations began 31 March 1998. Cyprus joined the European Union on 1 May 2004. To fulfil its commitment as a member of the European Union, Cyprus withdrew from the Non-Aligned Movement on accession, retaining observer status.

Oceania

Multilateral relations
Cyprus–NATO relations

Overview

The Republic of Cyprus maintains diplomatic relations with 179 states (including the Holy See and Palestinian National Authority) and is United Nations, Union for the Mediterranean and European Union full member. It does not maintain diplomatic relations with:
 Azerbaijan, Kosovo,
 Benin, Republic of Congo, Central African Republic, Equatorial Guinea, Djibouti, South Sudan
 Bhutan
 Kiribati, Palau, Tuvalu
 Haiti, Saint Kitts and Nevis
 Cook Islands, Niue
 Abkhazia, South Ossetia, Somaliland, Sahrawi Arab Democratic Republic, Artsakh, Republic of China (Taiwan), Transnistria
The Republic of Cyprus is not recognised by Turkey.

International disputes

The 1974 invasion of the Turkish army divided the island nation into two. The internationally recognised Republic of Cyprus currently has effective control in the south of the island (59% of the island's land area) while its area not under its effective control makes up 37% of the island. Turkey utilising the territory occupied during the invasion recognizes a declared separatist UDI of Turkish Cypriots in 1983, contrary to multiple United Nations Security Council Resolutions. The two territories of the Republic are separated by a United Nations Buffer Zone (4% of the island); there are two UK sovereign base areas mostly within the Greek Cypriot portion of the island.

Illicit drugs

Cyprus is a minor transit point for cannabis and cocaine via air routes and container traffic to Europe, especially from Lebanon; some hashish transits as well. The island has also been criticised for supposedly lax guns control legislation.

Cyprus and the Commonwealth of Nations

Although Cyprus became an independent republic in 1960, Cyprus has been a member state of the Commonwealth of Nations since 1961.

See also

List of diplomatic missions in Cyprus
List of Minister of Foreign Affairs of the Republic of Cyprus
Foreign relations of Northern Cyprus

References

External link

 
Cyprus and the Commonwealth of Nations